The Alternative Left or The Left, is a political party of the left in the Canton of Bern, Switzerland that existed at the national level from 2010 to 2018. This party sought to unite the political forces and movements farther to the left on Switzerland's political spectrum than the centre-left Social Democratic Party and the Green Party.

Their sole current National Council of Switzerland member was until 2011 Josef Zisyadis, who was elected in 2007 for the Swiss Labour Party. He was still a member of the SLP, but in official publications he was only a member of the Alternative Left.

History 

After an opening party congress on 21 November 2009, in Schaffhausen, the party was officially founded six months later at the congress of Lausanne on 29 May 2010. In that congress the party presented a program of nine important political points. The third congress took place in Zurich on 5 March 2011, where party members voted to launch a national referendum blocking the flat-rate tax incentive favoring foreign millionaires which financial lobbies had sought to enthrone as a  Swiss constitutional amendment. The same referendum in the canton of Zurich, originating with the Alternative List, was earlier approved in that Canton by Zurich's voters with a 52.9% majority in February 2009. The third congress was at the 30th juny in Biel with a discussion with Stéphane Hessel in the afternoon.

The national organisation got dissolved in 2018, while the local section in Bern as well as the groups that were united under the Alternative Left are still in existence.

Sections 
In total the "Alternative Left" counts actually six official sections:
 
 
 
 
 
 

In the French-speaking part of Switzerland the members of the party come mainly from the Swiss Party of Labour,  and independents. The section in Bern is a newly created one, the section in Valais was already founded 2007 at an earlier election rally.

There are also other groups, that are involved in the AL, but are not official members of the party:

Electoral results

Parliament

References

Numerous Swiss national press clippings dealing with events cited in French, German, and Italian texts
Correspondence and proceedings emanating from 2009 Congress at Schaffhausen and 2011 Congress in Zurich

External links 
  

Alternative Left
Democratic socialist parties in Europe
Socialist parties in Switzerland
Anti-capitalist political parties
Environmentalism in Switzerland
2010 establishments in Switzerland
Political parties established in 2010